CinePaint is a free and open source computer program for painting and retouching bitmap frames of films. It is a fork of version 1.0.4 of the GNU Image Manipulation Program (GIMP).  It enjoyed some success as one of the earliest open source tools developed for feature motion picture visual effects and animation work. 
The main reason for this adoption over mainline GIMP was its support for high bit depths (greater than 8-bits per channel) which can be required for film work. The mainline GIMP project later added high bit depths in GIMP 2.9.2, released November 2015. It is free software under the GPL-2.0-or-later. In 2018, a post titled "CinePaint 2.0 Making Progress" announced progress, but version 2.0 has not been released as of 2022.

Main features 
Features that set CinePaint apart from its photo-editing predecessor include the frame manager, onion skinning, and the ability to work with 16-bit and floating point pixels for high-dynamic-range imaging (HDR). CinePaint supports a 16-bit color managed workflow for photographers and printers, including CIE*Lab and CMYK editing. It supports the Cineon, DPX, and OpenEXR image file formats. HDR creation from bracketed exposures is easy.

CinePaint is a professional open-source raster graphics editor, not a video editor. Per-channel color engine core: 8-bit, 16-bit, and 32-bit. The image formats it supports include BMP, CIN, DPX, EXR, GIF, JPEG, OpenEXR, PNG, TIFF, and XCF.

CinePaint is currently available for UNIX and Unix-like OSes including Mac OS X and IRIX. The program is available on Linux, Mac OS X, FreeBSD and NetBSD. Its main competitors are the mainline GIMP and Adobe Photoshop, although the latter is only available for Mac OS X and Microsoft Windows. Glasgow, a completely new code architecture being used for CinePaint, is expected to make a new Windows version possible and is currently under production. The Glasgow effort is FLTK based. This effort appears to have stalled.

CinePaint version 1.4.4 appeared on SourceForge on 2021/5/6, followed by CinePaint 1.4.5 on 30. May 2021.

Movies 
Examples of the software's application in the movie industry include:
 Elf (2003)
 Looney Tunes: Back in Action (2003)
 League of Extraordinary Gentlemen (2003)
 Duplex (2003)
 The Last Samurai (2003)
 Showtime (2002)
 Blue Crush (2002)
 2 Fast 2 Furious (2003)
 The Harry Potter series
 Cats & Dogs (2001)
 Dr. Dolittle 2 (2001)
 Little Nicky (2000)
 The Grinch (2000)
 The 6th Day (2000)
 Stuart Little (1999)
 Planet of the Apes (2001)
 Stuart Little 2 (2002)
 Spider-Man (2002)

Under its former name Film Gimp, CinePaint was used for films such as Scooby-Doo (2002), Harry Potter and the Philosopher's Stone (2001), The Last Samurai (2003) and Stuart Little (1999).

See also 

 Comparison of raster graphics editors

References

External links 
 
 Sourceforge project site
 CinePaint Wiki and downloads
 16-bit imaging. From digital camera to print, a colour management tutorial
 Basic color management for X (linux.com)
 High Dynamic Range images under Linux (linux.com)
 GIMP and Film Production

Cross-platform software
Free raster graphics editors
Free video software
Raster graphics editors for Linux
Software forks
Graphics software that uses GTK
Video software that uses GTK